Boban Maksimović (Serbian Cyrillic: Бобан Максимовић; born 10 October 1985) is a Swiss football midfielder.

Career
He signed by FC Winterthur on 31 January 2006 having previously played for BSC Young Boys and FC Baden.

He played a game in UEFA Champions League 2004–05 second qualifying round.

In summer 2008, he moved to Serbia, where he signed with former European champions Red Star Belgrade. After not getting much chances there, he moved to another Serbian SuperLiga club FK Vojvodina where he played until January 2010 when he returned to Switzerland, this time to play with FC Biel-Bienne.

In summer 2011 he moved to FC Breitenrain Bern.

International career
Maksimović is a former youth international and was in the Swiss U-17 squad that won the 2002 UEFA European Under-17 Championship.

Honours
 UEFA European Under-17 Championship: 2002

References

External links
 Boban Maksimović at Srbijafudbal

1985 births
Living people
Sportspeople from Loznica
Serbian emigrants to Switzerland
Swiss men's footballers
Swiss expatriate footballers
Association football midfielders
BSC Young Boys players
FC Baden players
FC Winterthur players
Red Star Belgrade footballers
FK Vojvodina players
Serbian SuperLiga players
Swiss Super League players
Swiss people of Serbian descent